The Ball of Letters (from the Spanish: La Pelota de Letras) is a stand-up comedy DVD released by Colombian comedian Andrés López Forero. More than 2.5 million people have attended the show. López has presented his show in many Latin American countries. In 2005 he won the HOLA Award from the Hispanic Organization of Latin Actors for the "Outstanding Solo Performance" after sold out shows in New York and Miami.

External links
La Pelota de Letras (the ball of letters) official website

Stand-up comedy on DVD
Colombian comedy